The men's 1500 metre freestyle competition of the swimming events at the 1983 Pan American Games took place on 22 August. The last Pan American Games champion was Brian Goodell of US.

This race consisted of thirty lengths of the pool, all lengths being in freestyle.

Results
All times are in minutes and seconds.

Heats

Final 
The final was held on August 22.

References

Swimming at the 1983 Pan American Games